Mount Work is a  mountain in the Gowlland Range on southern Vancouver Island.

References

External links 
Mount Work Regional Park

Mountains of British Columbia under 1000 metres
Vancouver Island Ranges